The masters women's 800 metres was an exhibition event for women in the W55 division at the 2016 IAAF World Indoor Championships held on 19 March 2016.

Helene Marie Douay led from the gun but it wasn't as simple as that.  Lesley Chaplin, Julie Hayden and Karen Brooks were all in close order behind her.  On the final lap, Douay put a little bit of a gap on Hayden who was on her shoulder as the lap began, then Chaplin started sprinting from third place. making up almost all of the gap by the finish.

Results

References

800 metres
800 metres at the World Athletics Indoor Championships
2016 in women's athletics